Mineyev or Mineev is a Russian masculine surname, its feminine counterpart is Mineyeva or Mineeva. It may refer to
Aleksandr Mineyev (born 1988), Russian football player
Maksim Mineyev (born 1984), Russian football player
Olga Mineyeva (born 1952), Soviet runner
Viktor Mineyev (1937–2002), Soviet modern pentathlete 
Vladimir Mineev (born 1990), Russian heavyweight kick boxer
Vladimir Petrovich Mineev (born 1945), Russian theoretical physicist

Russian-language surnames